Camp Stambaugh may be:

 Camp Stambaugh (Ohio)
 Camp Stambaugh (Wyoming)